Ryan Garcia (born August 8, 1998) is an American professional boxer. He held the WBC interim lightweight title in 2021. As of May 2022, he is ranked as the world's sixth-best active lightweight by The Ring magazine, the Transnational Boxing Rankings Board, and ESPN, and tenth by BoxRec.

Amateur career 
García started boxing at the age of seven and dreamed of one day representing the United States in the 2016 Olympics. He became a 15-time national amateur champion and amassed an amateur record of 215–15.

Professional career

Early career 
Garcia turned professional at age 17 on June 9, 2016. In his first professional bout, he fought against Edgar Meza in Tijuana, winning the match by TKO. Garcia soon signed with Golden Boy Promotions in November 2016. Oscar De La Hoya announced Garcia would make his debut on December 17, 2016 on the Smith-Hopkins light-heavyweight main event at The Forum. Garcia won the fight by knockout in the second round.

He trained with Eddy Reynoso, who also works with Canelo Alvarez and Scar Valdez in their San Diego, California, facility, from October 2018 to February 2022.

In September 2019, Garcia extended his contract with a new five-year deal with Golden Boy Promotions. Specific details of the multi-year deal were not disclosed. Garcia had a cancelled fight with Avery Sparrow.

Domestic success

Garcia vs. Duno 
Golden Boy announced Garcia's next bout would be the co-main event of Canelo Álvarez vs. Sergey Kovalev at the MGM Grand Garden Arena. On September 18, 2019 Romero Duno was announced as Garcia's next opponent. Garcia defeated Duno with a first-round knockout, capturing the WBC Silver lightweight title.

Garcia vs. Fonseca 
On January 2, 2020 Golden Boy announced Garcia would be facing Francisco Fonseca on February 14 at the Honda Center in Anaheim. Garcia landed seven punches in the fight before landing a lead left hook which knocked out Fonseca in the first round.

Garcia vs. Campbell 
On October 8, it was announced Garcia would be facing Olympic gold medalist Luke Campbell for the interim WBC lightweight title at Fantasy Springs Resort in Indio, California. The fight was originally scheduled for December 5, 2020, but was pushed back to January 2, 2021 due to Campbell contracting Covid-19. The venue was also changed to the American Airlines Center in Dallas, Texas. In round 2 of his fight with Campbell, Garcia was knocked down for the first time in his professional career. He had survived the knockdown, as he got up shortly after hitting the canvas. Later on in the fight, in round 7, Garcia  hit Luke Campbell with a fight-ending body shot. CompuBox statistics show Garcia outlanded Campbell 94 to 74 (32%) in total punches, and 77 to 51 (44%) in power punches, with Campbell outlanding Garcia in jabs 23 to 17 (15%). The fight was ultimately Campbell's last bout before his retirement.

Cancelled bouts vs. Fortuna and Diaz 
On April 13, 2021 it was announced by DAZN that Garcia would defend his newly won WBC interim lightweight title against Dominican former WBA (Regular) super featherweight champion, Javier Fortuna. The bout was set for July 9 in a location to be determined, and the winner would become the mandatory challenger to WBC lightweight champion, Devin Haney. However, on April 24, Garcia announced he had withdrawn from the bout, in order to "manage his health and well being". Former IBF super featherweight champion Joseph Diaz agreed to move up to lightweight to fill in for Garcia, and fight Fortuna on July 9. Garcia was subsequently stripped of his newly crowned WBC interim lightweight title, with the title being on the line for Diaz and Fortuna instead.

On October 8, 2021, it was announced that Garcia would be challenging Joseph Diaz in Los Angeles on November 27 for his WBC interim lightweight title following Díaz's victory over Fortuna, the same title Garcia had held after beating Luke Campbell and was subsequently stripped of earlier in 2021. On October 15, 2021, Mike Coppinger of ESPN revealed that García suffered a hand injury and the fight with Diaz will be postponed.

Garcia vs. Tagoe 
On February 4, 2022, it was announced that Garcia would be returning to the ring after a long spell of inactivity against former IBO lightweight champion Emmanuel Tagoe on April 9. He easily dominated Tagoe and scored a knockdown in Round 2, winning a unanimous decision with the scores of 119-108, 119-108 and 118-109.

Garcia vs. Fortuna 
On July 16, 2022 Garcia faced Javier Fortuna in a super lightweight bout in Crypto.com Arena in Los Angeles, California. Garcia dominated the fight scoring 3 knockdowns, and defeating Fortuna in 6 rounds via TKO.

Garcia vs. Davis 

On February 24, 2023, it was announced that Garcia would face Gervonta Davis on April 22, in Las Vegas, Nevada. The long awaited bout would be a joint PPV event between Showtime and DAZN.

Personal life
Garcia comes from a large family. His parents were actively involved in his amateur career. They continue to assist him with his professional career as his father remains one of his trainers and his mother works as his Personal Administrative Assistant for commercial projects. In March 2019, Garcia's daughter was born.

Although American by birth and nationality, Garcia often incorporates his Mexican heritage into his persona. He often carries both the U.S. and Mexican flags into the ring and frequently wears red, white, and blue colors. He was trained by Eddy Reynoso, who also trains Canelo Álvarez and Óscar Valdez at their gym in San Diego, California, from October 2018 to February 2022. He is now currently trained by Joe Goosen.

In December 2022, Garcia began training in Brazilian Jiu-Jitsu under Rener Gracie.

Television commercials
During 2021, Garcia signed a deal with sports drink Gatorade to appear on television commercials advertising the brand, thus becoming the first American boxer ever to appear on a Gatorade campaign. On some commercials, Garcia appears with NBA basketball star Damian Lillard.

Professional boxing record

References

External links

Ryan García at Goldenboy Promotions
Ryan García at VVNG: García Deal
Ryan García at ESPN: 2017 Prospect

|-

Boxers from California
American boxers of Mexican descent
Featherweight boxers
Super-featherweight boxers
Lightweight boxers
Living people
People from Victorville, California
1998 births